Incilius aucoinae is a species of toads in the family Bufonidae. It is found in south-western Costa Rica and adjacent western Panama. Before its description in 2004, it was confused with Incilius melanochlorus.

Etymology
The specific name aucoinae honors Lisa Aucoin (1971–2001), an American herpetologist who died in a car accident shortly after returning from a trip to Costa Rica.

Habitat and conservation
It is a very abundant species living in forested habitats, from tree plantations to primary forests. Reproduction takes place in broad, low-gradient streams and rivers during the dry season. There are no important threats to this adaptable species; it also occurs in several protected areas.

References

aucoinae
Amphibians of Costa Rica
Amphibians of Panama
Amphibians described in 2004
Taxonomy articles created by Polbot